Common Spreadwing may refer to:
 Lestes sponsa in Europe
 Lestes plagiatus in Africa
 Lestes disjunctus in North America

Animal common name disambiguation pages